Silwerkrans is a village in Bojanala District Municipality in the North West province of South Africa. The village is occupied by the Batlokwa ba Bogatsu tribe. The Batlokwa are thought to have occupied this village during the1800s. The royal house has no Kgosi. Dr. Lesedi Motsatsi is the heir to the throne but has not been enthroned.Tlokweng village has sub-clans (makgotla) led by dikgosana.

Geography
The village is divided into sections mainly aligned by clans (makgotla). Some of the oldest sections are: Rathoane, Rasennelo, Ramolefe, Mokgwa, Siko, Mmaotse Raseekana, Rakuba, Ramochina, Ramoji, Ramodisa, Raphiri, Lekubung, Monneng, Ledubeng, Rramothibe, Kgosing, Metejwe, Sopeng and Raleoto. 

Raleoto extends the village east of the Mase River and consists of sub-sections, namely Phokojweng, Ranthoakgale, Mothowammona, Masetlheng, Matshelapata, Terateng and Dinngogong. Kolontwane and Mase are two rivers crossing the village from south to north. Kolontwane River is popular for having a waterfall called Metsi-a-wa, which attracts pilgrims who come for spiritual rituals.

Education 
Tlokweng has three primary schools and two secondary schools. The primary schools are Bogatsu Primary School, Thakadu Primary School and Mokalake Primary School. The Secondary schools are Kgosibodiba Secondary School and Motlhaputseng High School.

Notables 
Notable residents of Silwerkrans include:

 Justice Bess Nkabinde
 Prof Shole Shole 
 Dennis Tshetlhane

Religion
The village has a rich history of religious activities with the wide practice of Christianity. Tlokweng also has strong traditional and cultural religion. It is still widely common for ancestral practices (ditiro tsa Badimo) to be held within families in the village. Some of the mainstream churches in Tlokweng includes Transvaal Basotho Church (also known as RraBedi), Lutheran Church, Zion Christian Church (ZCC), Apostolic Faith Mission, Pentecostal Holiness Church, Roman Catholic Church, International Pentecostal Christian Church (also known as kwa-Modise) and a wide variety of traditional Zionist Churches. Since the early 1990s there has been a wide proliferation of charismatic Christian churches.Some of these churches include El Shadai Ministries and many others using temporary tents as church gathering facility. Some of the best known preachers in the village includes Reverend Thobedi of Lutheran Church, Reverend Tshinangwe of Pentecostal Holiness Church and the young generation of charismatic churches.

References

Populated places in the Moses Kotane Local Municipality